Lava Kusa is a 1963 Indian Telugu film. 

Lava Kusa may also refer to

 Lava (Ramayana) and Kusha (Ramayana), characters in the Ramayana
 Lava Kusa (1934 film), a 1934 film directed by C. Pullayya
 Lava Kusha (2007 film), a 2007 film
 Lava Kusa: The Warrior Twins, a 2011 film
 Lava Kusa (2015 film), a 2015 film